The 2008 NASCAR Sprint Cup Series was the 60th season of professional stock car racing in the United States and the 37th modern-era Cup season. It was contested over thirty-six races, and began on February 9 at Daytona International Speedway with the Budweiser Shootout exhibition race, followed by the 50th Daytona 500 on February 17. The season continued with the 2008 Chase for the Sprint Cup beginning on September 14 with the Sylvania 300 at New Hampshire Motor Speedway and concluded with the Ford 400 at Homestead-Miami Speedway on November 16.

As a result of the merger between Sprint Corporation and Nextel Communications, NASCAR's premier series was renamed as the NASCAR Sprint Cup Series beginning with the 2008 season, The season marked the first season that the Car of Tomorrow was used for the entire season after being used for select races during the 2007 season. Coors Light also replaced Budweiser as the Official Beer of NASCAR, thereby becoming the new sponsor of the Pole Award given to pole winner in each Sprint Cup Series race. However, Budweiser was still the official sponsor for Bud Shootout at Daytona in February. Jimmie Johnson of Hendrick Motorsports was crowned champion at season's end, making him only the second driver in NASCAR's top division to win three championships in a row, with the first being Cale Yarborough.

Top stories

Car of Tomorrow 
All Sprint Cup races utilized the Car of Tomorrow (CoT) template. NASCAR announced on May 22, 2007, that the original timetable, which would have the full-time use of the single car template in 2009, was being abandoned as 80% of all owners were in favor of moving the full-time use of the CoT one year ahead so they would not race with two sets of rules for all but ten races. The cars approved for the 2008 season were the Chevrolet Impala, the Dodge Charger, the Ford Fusion and the Toyota Camry. Dodge had used the Avenger in the 2007 CoT races, but stated that the Charger would be used full-time in 2008.

Economic problems affect NASCAR 
The Economic crisis of 2008, with high gas prices over US $4 a gallon caused NASCAR's largely blue-collar fan base to feel the pinch.

While Bristol was one of a few tracks that still sold out, others saw crowds shrink. Daytona International Speedway sold out the Daytona 500, but not the Coke Zero 400. Some track ticket packages now included all-you-can-eat deals, and tracks also offered nearby campgrounds to entice those who come for several days to see Nationwide and Craftsman Truck races. For their fall race, Lowe's Motor Speedway offered discounts on local hotel rooms, novelties and food and drink.

The economy also affected the teams themselves with high diesel fuel prices, with that fuel needed to power the semi-trailer trucks which transport the race cars to and from racetracks. Sponsorships also grew increasingly harder to come by, further increasing the gap between teams. Before the season began, Morgan-McClure Motorsports ceased operations for their single-car team, while Yates Racing had no major sponsor on the No. 28 and No. 38 cars that they run in the series, as their M&M's sponsorships moved to the Joe Gibbs Racing No. 18 team. The Yates team made do in piecemeal fashion, finding companies to sponsor a few races at a time, a practice that paid the bills but stretched the marketing department. As a result of the cutbacks, half of the one hundred employees at Yates were laid off.

Even better sponsored teams struggled. On July 1, Chip Ganassi Racing shut down its No. 40 team with 2007 IndyCar Champion and Indianapolis 500 winner Dario Franchitti driving because of a lack of sponsorship funding, becoming the first major victim. Ganassi Racing lost 70 jobs as a result of the closure. Other companies also switched teams for 2009. Caterpillar Inc., despite its decade long relationship with Bill Davis Racing and its flagship No. 22, moved to Richard Childress Racing's No. 31 car driven by Jeff Burton, while General Mills, associating itself with Petty Enterprises since 2000, also left to head for RCR's fourth team.

To counter many of these problems, teams also took on financial partners, much like Fenway Sports Group joining Jack Roush and George N. Gillett Jr. teaming up with Ray Evernham last year. In June 2008, Petty Enterprises sold a majority share to Boston Ventures as another example of the economic struggles.

Teams and drivers

Complete schedule 
List of NASCAR Sprint Cup Series teams in 2008 (43 full-time teams).

Limited schedule

Schedule

Television

United States 
The 2008 season marked the second year of television contracts with Fox, TNT and ESPN/ABC. The biggest changes involved ESPN and ABC, as Dale Jarrett became the network's lead race color commentator and Rusty Wallace became the pre-race analyst. Dale, who completed his driving career with the Sprint All-Star Race XXIV, followed in the footsteps of his father, Ned, who worked with ESPN through most of the 1980s through the 2000 NASCAR season. Allen Bestwick took over the hosting role for all races as well as some editions of ESPN2's NASCAR Now, replacing Brent Musburger and Suzy Kolber on the pre-race show, with Shannon Spake taking Bestwick's place as pit reporter. Also, veteran NASCAR reporter Nicole Manske (along with Ryan Burr) took over as a part-time host of NASCAR Now show for Erik Kuselias. No major changes were made by Fox and TNT for the 2008 season.

One innovation was Fox's "Gopher Cam", placed below the track near the inside of the turns for a unique perspective. In the need for a name for their new mascot, Fox turned to internet users and even drivers for suggestions, and the gopher cam mascot was named "Digger". "Digger" is now emblazoned on T-shirts, hats and even as a plush toy.

Another innovation was TNT's "RaceBuddy", an internet application that showed multiple views of the race and radio feeds from drivers (using NASCAR.com Race Day Scanner).

Canada and Mexico 
In Canada NASCAR races were seen on TSN and RDS in English and French, while Speed Channel Latin America held the rights in Mexico and all of Latin America, including the Bud Shootout, the Gatorade Duels and the Sprint All-Star Race.

Outside North America 
Sky Sports held the rights in Great Britain, while Five US aired a one-hour highlights package preceding each race. In Australia the 2008 Sprint Cup Series season was covered by Fox SPORTS as usual however, Free-to-air TV TEN HD presented marquee events live along with one hour highlights packages from all other rounds the Saturday after the event. Ten HD also presented the entire Nationwide series season, marking the first time that a full NASCAR Championship was shown on Free-to-Air TV in Australia, mostly due to Marcos Ambrose's involvement in the series. NTV held the rights in Japan, while Sky Italia held rights in Italy (only NNS) and Premiere Sport held the German rights. In Spain, Teledeporte broadcast six live races and hour-long summaries of the remaining thirty.

2008 competition changes 
On January 21, 2008, NASCAR announced various competition changes for the 2008 season.

Qualifying procedures 
 In all three national series, teams that were not locked into the starting field via the Owners Points exemption qualified together as a group at the end of their respective qualifying sessions. This rule was dubbed "The Boris Said Rule" as per what happened during qualifying for the 2007 Pepsi 400, where Said was the provisional pole sitter when rain washed out the remainder of qualifying, and rules required that all cars must attempt to make a lap before inclement weather stops all activities. The session was washed out, and Said did not make the field as the field was set by the rulebook (Top 35 in points among owners, past race winners and qualifying attempts).

Revisions to pit road rules 
 Over-the-wall pit crews in NASCAR's three national series were able to hand push their car no more than three pit boxes away from their assigned pit box—limiting the crews to the same three-box length for pushing as the vehicles could drive through getting onto pit road.
 Outside tires that had been removed from a vehicle during a pit stop could no longer be free-rolled from the outside of the pit box to the wall. The tires were required to be hand-directed to the inner half of the pit box before being released.

Fuel cell size 
 Only NASCAR Sprint Cup Series ran the same upgraded  gallon fuel cell which was used in the 2007 Nextel Cup Series. The fuel cell was a safety feature that was added that year, replacing the old 22-gallon cell while 22-gallon cell was retained for NASCAR Nationwide Series and NASCAR Craftsman Truck Series.

Engines 
 A new engine combination package introduced in the Nationwide and Craftsman Truck series allowed for cost-saving opportunities for teams. Modifications reduced RPMs and horsepower, which helped engines and pieces to last longer. In turn, teams had the opportunity to run multiple races using the same engine components.

Tire usage at non-sanctioned tests 
 Teams in all three national series received an allotment of tires to use for non-NASCAR sanctioned tests. Cup Series teams had access to 200 tires over the course of the year (except for tests that were sanctioned by Goodyear); Nationwide teams got 160 tires and Truck teams got 120 tires.

NASCAR fines 
 Money collected from fines issued to drivers and others was remitted to the NASCAR Foundation, which supported a variety of charitable initiatives. Previously, fine money had been added to the season-ending point funds paid to drivers based on their finish in the point standings.

Testing 
The first tests followed the change of the calendar at Daytona International Speedway in the first two full weeks of January. Teams that finished in odd numbered positions (1, 3, 5, etc.) through the 2007 USG Sheetrock 400 tested January 7 through 9, while even numbered finishers (2, 4, 6, etc.) through that same period tested January 14 through 16. Speed televised nightly reports throughout this period, as well as the events of the annual Media Tour in Charlotte and the tests in Las Vegas (held on January 28 and 29th) and California (held on January 31 and February 1).

The remaining dates and tracks that were announced December 4, 2007 were:

 Phoenix International Raceway – March 3 and 4
 Pocono Raceway – May 27 and 28
 Lowe's Motor Speedway – September 23 and 24

On April 15, an additional practice session was announced by NASCAR at Lowe's to be held on May 5 and 6th due to problems that were unforeseen at both Las Vegas and Texas during their spring races.

2008 season races

Budweiser Shootout 

The 2008 NASCAR season and the 2008 edition of Speedweeks began with the thirtieth annual Budweiser Shootout on February 9 at Daytona International Speedway in Daytona Beach, Florida. The non-points race, featured the previous season's pole winners and past winners of the event. Following tradition teams randomly picked their starting positions, Kurt Busch drew the pole, but ultimately had to start near the rear due to a crash in final practice. The 2008 race set a record with 23 drivers starting the race, the largest field ever in the event. Dale Earnhardt Jr. won his first NASCAR race with his new team Hendrick Motorsports and his first Sprint Cup Series win since May 2006 at Richmond, leading a record 47 of the 70 laps.

Daytona 500

Pole qualifying 
Qualifying for the 2008 Daytona 500 in Daytona Beach, Florida at Daytona International Speedway took place on February 10 of that year. Jimmie Johnson won the pole with Michael Waltrip starting second who had been the center of controversy during a cheating scandal in last year's race.

Gatorade Duels 

The Gatorade Duels were held on February 14, 2008, which established the starting order for the 2008 Daytona 500. Dale Earnhardt Jr. won the first race, with Darrell Waltrip waving the green flag, and the race was wreck free, while the second race was won by Denny Hamlin driving a Toyota, giving the Japanese manufacturer its first Sprint Cup Series victory. The win also marked the first win by a foreign make since 1954, when Al Keller won at Linden Airport, driving a Jaguar. Bill Elliott driving the #21 Ford for Wood Brothers Racing failed to race his way in during the first duel, this will be the first time the Wood Brothers team has not competed in NASCAR's signature event in 46 years. A wreck in the second race on lap 17 took out Jacques Villeneuve, Stanton Barrett, Dario Franchitti, and Jamie McMurray after Villeneuve got loose in turn 3.

Daytona 500 

The 50th annual running of the Daytona 500 was held on February 17, 2008, marking the 50th anniversary since the inaugural running in 1959. Ryan Newman won the race with teammate Kurt Busch finishing second, it marked team owner Roger Penske's first win on a restrictor-plate track. The win also ended Ryan Newman's 81 race winless drought in Sprint Cup Series racing. Jeff Burton led during the last restart with 3 laps left and immediately lost the lead. Tony Stewart led during the last lap but it was the Penske Racing teammates of Ryan Newman and Kurt Busch who denied Stewart the win as he tried for the 10th time to win the race.

Auto Club 500 

The 2008 Auto Club 500 was run on February 24 and February 25 due to rain at the newly renamed Auto Club Speedway of Southern California (previously California Speedway) in Fontana, California. Qualifying was canceled for the Sprint Cup, Nationwide and Craftsman Truck Series after periods of rain showers fell for most of the day on Friday. As a result, the race lineup was determined by the NASCAR rule book. The race began on late Sunday afternoon but was red flagged and eventually postponed until Monday morning. Veteran NASCAR driver Mark Martin made his 700th Sprint Cup Series start. The first caution of the race was brought out when Denny Hamlin lost control in turn 3 after running over some water that had seeps up through cracks in the track surface. The next caution involved a large wreck when Casey Mears spun out in turn 2 after also running over water. The wreck collected Casey's teammate Dale Earnhardt Jr.

Reed Sorenson and Sam Hornish Jr. were also involved. Hornish hit Sorenson's car causing his car's hood to come up and hit his windshield obscuring his vision leading him to rear end the back of Casey Mears' car causing Mears' car to tumble onto its side. The race was red flagged as track workers cleaned up and tried to repair the water problem by cutting into the track. Drivers who were involved in early wrecks notably Earnhardt Jr. and Mears complained that NASCAR should not have started the race with water still seeping onto the track. Eventually a seventh caution for rain put the race on hold, at 11:00 PM PT (2:00 AM ET), NASCAR decided to postpone the remaining race laps until Monday morning at 10:00 AM PT (1:00 PM ET) due to seeping water on the track. When the race resumed, it was Hendrick Motorsports teammates Jeff Gordon and Jimmie Johnson leading the race until Carl Edwards took the lead from Johnson to win his first race at Auto Club Speedway. The Nationwide Series race was run one hour after the conclusion of the Sprint Cup race.

Failed to make race as qualifying was canceled due to rain: Patrick Carpentier (#10), Mike Skinner (#27), Ken Schrader (#49), A. J. Allmendinger (#84), Burney Lamar (#08)

UAW-Dodge 400 

The UAW-Dodge 400 was run on March 2 at Las Vegas Motor Speedway. Kyle Busch, a Las Vegas native, won the pole and led 56 laps in the race before slipping to 11th. Matt Kenseth also ran strong during the race leading 70 laps and was running third with five laps to go when he was spun by Jeff Gordon. Gordon's car hit hard against the inside retaining wall head on at 180 miles per hour, and the wall did not have a SAFER barrier, this caused his car's radiator to fly out from the chassis into the path of oncoming traffic. Kenseth was able to recover from the spin without hitting anything. The wreck brought a red flag on lap 264 as track workers cleaned up, Jeff Gordon walked away sore from the wreck and made the point that SAFER barriers should be installed to the inside walls. Carl Edwards went on to win his second race in a row and the ninth of his career.

Following the race it was announced that the #99 car driven by Edwards had failed post-race inspection. On March 5, Edwards was docked 100 championship points with team owner Jack Roush also docked 100 owner points. Carl Edwards' crew chief Bob Osbourne was fined $100,000 and suspended for six races until April 30. As the 99 team qualified for the Chase for the Sprint Cup, the team did not receive 10 bonus points for the UAW-Dodge 400 victory used for determining the Chase seeding order.

Failed to qualify: A. J. Allmendinger (#84), Joe Nemechek (#78), John Andretti (#34), Johnny Sauter (#21; crashed on first lap)

NOTE: Burney Lamar (#08) withdrew prior to qualifying.

Kobalt Tools 500 

The Kobalt Tools 500 was held on March 9 at Atlanta Motor Speedway. Jeff Gordon won the pole. Carl Edwards had the car to beat along with Kyle Busch, although Edwards' engine expired late in the race. Busch would go on to lead 173 laps and win the race.

Failed to qualify: Ken Schrader (#49), Bill Elliott (#21), Johnny Benson (#27), John Andretti (#34), Burney Lamar (#08)

Food City 500 

The Food City 500 was held on March 16 at Bristol Motor Speedway in Bristol, Tennessee. Qualifying was canceled due to a day-long rain on March 14, and as a result, the field was set by NASCAR's rulebook, giving Jimmie Johnson the 2007 series champion, the pole position. Jeff Burton won the race after it was extended six laps due to the green-white-checkered finish rule when Denny Hamlin had fuel pump problems on the final restart. This was 1999 champion Dale Jarrett's final points race after 668 career starts.

NOTE: Race extended six laps due to green-white-checkered finish.

Failed to make race as qualifying was canceled due to rain: Patrick Carpentier (#10), Jeff Green (#21), John Andretti (#34).

As a result of the standings after this race, two teams that were not in the Top-35 in owners points, the #83 Red Bull Toyota Camry of Brian Vickers and the #2 Miller Lite Dodge Charger of Kurt Busch (owners points were given to the #77) were locked into the Top 35 after the first five races.

Goody's Cool Orange 500 

The Goody's Cool Orange 500 was held on March 30 at Martinsville Speedway in Ridgeway, Virginia. Jeff Gordon won the pole. Kyle Petty failed to make the race after Dario Franchitti tied with his qualifying time, due to the fact that Franchitti was 38th in owners points and Petty was 40th, marking the first time since 2004 that he failed to make a race. Denny Hamlin won this race, the third for Toyota in Sprint Cup history. The race was notable for having 20 caution periods, the second most ever during a NASCAR Sprint Cup race; only the 22 cautions imposed at the 2005 Coca-Cola 600 has more.

Failed to qualify: Kyle Petty (#45), Tony Raines (#08), John Andretti (#34), Joe Nemechek (#78)

Samsung 500 

The Samsung 500 was held on April 6 at Texas Motor Speedway in Fort Worth, Texas. Dale Earnhardt Jr. won the pole. The race was won by Carl Edwards who started 2nd and led 123 laps. The major story of the race weekend was Michael McDowell's near head-on crash during qualifying after he lost control heading into turn 1 on his second lap. McDowell's car slammed into the turn 1 SAFER barrier and spun upside down for several hundred yards before the car began a series of at least eight barrel rolls, coming to rest at the bottom of the race track near the infield. McDowell exited the car and was ok. Qualifying was delayed 1 hour and 12 minutes as NASCAR officials assessed and repaired damage to the SAFER barrier.

NOTES: 1. Race extended five laps due to a green-white-checkered finish. 2. During post race inspection Ryan Newman's #12 car was found to be one-eighth of an inch higher beyond the allotted half-inch tolerance. As a result, Newman and car owner Roger Penske were penalized 25 championship driver and 25 championship owner points, respectively. Crew chief Roy McCauley was fined $25,000 and placed on probation until December 31.

Failed to qualify: Dario Franchitti (#40), Chad McCumbee (#45), Burney Lamar (#08)

Subway Fresh Fit 500 

The Subway Fresh Fit 500 was held on April 12 at Phoenix International Raceway in Avondale, Arizona. Ryan Newman won the pole. Coverage of the pre-race was interrupted when Fox switched over to cover the remaining Yankees-Red Sox baseball game. Jimmie Johnson won the race by not pitting for fuel during the last laps. The win marked Hendrick Motorsports' first win of the 2008 season.

Failed to qualify: Kyle Petty (#45), John Andretti (#34)

Aaron's 499 

The Aaron's 499 was held April 27 at Talladega Superspeedway in Talladega, Alabama. The race marked the one-quarter mark of the season. Joe Nemechek won the pole. David Stremme substituted for Dario Franchitti, who fractured his left ankle in a hard crash during the Nationwide Series Aaron's 312 race. Kyle Busch won the race after leading only 12 laps. The race featured only eight cautions. Most of those cautions were results of one or two car incidents. However, the last caution was a result of the "Big One" that occurred in the final moments of the race. Because the crash occurred after the white flag had been waved, the race was allowed to finish under caution.

Failed to qualify: Dave Blaney (#22), J. J. Yeley (#96), John Andretti (#34)

Crown Royal presents the Dan Lowry 400 

The Crown Royal presents the Dan Lowry 400 was held on May 3 at Richmond International Raceway in Richmond, Virginia. Denny Hamlin won the pole and went on to lead 381 of the 400 laps. However, a leaking right-front tire caused him to fall back with 18 laps left. It then appeared that Dale Earnhardt Jr. whose last Sprint Cup win came at this race two years ago, would be able to win the race and end his winless streak. However Kyle Busch recovered from a restart failure and drove after Earnhardt Jr. With 5 laps left, Kyle Busch and Dale Earnhardt Jr. got side by side and Earnhardt Jr. crashed with 3 laps left. The caution flew and the fans were angry with Kyle Busch even though it was clear and obvious that Busch was not at fault; and that he and Earnhardt Jr. were just plain, cleanly racing and refusing to lose. Earnhardt Jr. himself said on the radio and in the post-race ceremonies that Busch was not at fault but nonetheless the fans jeered Busch for the rest of the race and in the days that followed.

Meanwhile, at the time of the contact RCR driver Clint Bowyer caught up with the two leaders and stole the lead from Kyle Busch. On the final restart Clint Bowyer drove off for his second NSCS victory while Kyle Busch fought Mark Martin for second place. It was Bowyer's last win in NASCAR while numbered as 07, and this win brought Chevrolet to winning the most NASCAR wins in history.

The other big story of the race was that Michael Waltrip was parked by NASCAR. With 46 laps left a caution flew when Casey Mears crashed. It was seen that Waltrip's hood was locked on Mears' rear and Waltrip was trying frantically to crash Mears. The hits caused Casey Mears to crash and bring out the yellow. Prior to the hits with Casey, Waltrip had hit the wall because of Casey's racing moves. NASCAR instantly parked Michael Waltrip causing Waltrip to face his first disqualification of his career.

NOTE: Race was extended by eight laps due to green-white-checker finish.

Failed to qualify: Ken Schrader (#40), Scott Wimmer (#33), Jon Wood (#21), John Andretti (#34)

Dodge Challenger 500 

The Dodge Challenger 500 was run May 10 at the newly repaved Darlington Raceway in Darlington, South Carolina. Kyle Busch was the winner of the race. this would be the last race under the "Dodge Challenger 500" name; next year the race will return to the original name of the Southern 500.

Failed to qualify: Johnny Sauter (#70), Jeff Green (#34)

Sprint All-Star Race XXIV 

Sprint All-Star Race XXIV and the Sprint Showdown were both held on May 17 at Lowe's Motor Speedway in the Charlotte, North Carolina suburb of Concord. This non-points race involved winners of the 2007 and 2008 season, along with past Sprint Cup champions and All-Star Race winners from the past decade (1998 through 2007) plus the top two finishing drivers of the Sprint Showdown and a driver voted in by fans from the Showdown whose car had to be raceable. On the line was $1,000,000 in prize money for the winner. Kasey Kahne finished fifth in the Showdown and was voted into the All-Star event and went onto capture the victory, becoming the third driver to qualify from the preliminary race and win the main event and the first chosen by the fan vote to do the same. The only cautions the race had was after all 4 segments ended which was 4 cautions.

Sprint Showdown

All-Star Race

Coca-Cola 600 

NASCAR's longest race in terms of distance, the Coca-Cola 600 was run on May 25 at Lowe's Motor Speedway in Concord, North Carolina, a suburb of Charlotte. Kyle Busch won the pole. Tony Stewart led the race in the final laps after making a pit stop for fuel only, but with three laps remaining Stewart blew a tire giving the lead to Kasey Kahne who was running five seconds behind. Kahne and Greg Biffle finished first and second respectively for the second week in a row. Kahne became the first driver to win the Coca-Cola 600 and the All-Star Race in the same year since Jimmie Johnson in 2003, and the sixth overall.

Failed to qualify: Jeff Green (#34), Stanton Barrett (#50), Jon Wood (#21), Joe Nemechek (#78), Tony Raines (#08)

Best Buy 400 

The Best Buy 400 was held on June 1 at Dover International Speedway in Dover, Delaware. Greg Biffle won the pole. A wreck on lap 17 ruined the day for championship contenders Tony Stewart, Kevin Harvick, Denny Hamlin, Dale Earnhardt Jr., Clint Bowyer, and Kasey Kahne. The wreck occurred when Elliott Sadler made slight contact with David Gilliland, Sadler's car spun out and blocked traffic down the narrow backstretch. Polesitter Greg Biffle dominated the early laps leading 164 of them. Although an alternator problem on lap 170 forced Biffle to relinquish his lead to teammate Carl Edwards. Biffle switched batteries and kept going, although he was forced to leave the cooling fans off inside his car. In the final 153 laps there were no cautions allowing Kyle Busch to build a lead over 8 seconds to second place runner Carl Edwards. Busch took the lead from Edwards during green-flag pit stops that ended on lap 237. Only the top six cars managed to stay on the lead lap.

Failed to qualify: Jason Leffler (#70), Chad McCumbee (#45)

Pocono 500 

The Pocono 500 was held on June 8 at Pocono Raceway in Long Pond, Pennsylvania. Kasey Kahne won the pole, he went on to win the race. Starting with Pocono TNT started its six race broadcast schedule. Kyle Busch qualified tenth but in the second practice hit the wall and started from the back. He finished dead last after a crash with Jamie McMurray, but had a big enough cushion in the standings to remain in first place over Jeff Burton by 21 points.

Failed to qualify: J. J. Yeley (#96)

NOTE: Tony Raines (#34) withdrew before the qualifying session.

LifeLock 400 

The LifeLock 400 was held on June 15 at Michigan International Speedway in Brooklyn, Michigan. Qualifying was cancelled because of rain after twelve drivers took times, and the field was set by the NASCAR rulebook. With a green-white-checkered finish extending the race, and fuel economy usage, Dale Earnhardt Jr. won his first points paying race in 76 attempts in the first win by a driver from North Carolina in a NASCAR Sprint Cup race since October 2006 at Talladega when Brian Vickers won; ironically, Vickers won for Earnhardt's new team, Hendrick Motorsports. It also marked the first time a Chevrolet has gone to victory lane in the last 14 Sprint Cup races there.

Failed to make race as qualifying was cancelled due to rain: Jason Leffler (#70), Tony Raines (#34).NOTES: 1. Race extended three laps due to green-white-checkered finish.2. The #87 Denver Mattress car driven by Kenny Wallace as well as the #08 car without a driver were withdrawn earlier in the week.

Toyota/Save Mart 350 

The first of two road course races on the schedule, the Toyota/Save Mart 350, was raced at Infineon Raceway at Sears Point in Sonoma, California on Sunday, June 22. Kasey Kahne won the pole, but Kyle Busch dominated the field again starting from the 30th position and winning. Marcos Ambrose made his NASCAR debut. He started in 7th but finished in 42nd

Failed to qualify: J. J. Yeley (#96), Scott Riggs (#70), Dario Franchitti (#40), Brandon Ash (#02)NOTE: Race was extended by two laps due to green-white-checkered finish.

Lenox Industrial Tools 301 

The Lenox Industrial Tools 301 was raced on Sunday, June 29 at New Hampshire Motor Speedway in Loudon, New Hampshire. The big surprise was sprung in qualifying when following a rain delay of nearly two hours, Québécois Patrick Carpentier won the pole position over Bobby Labonte. Another big surprise was when Kurt Busch won the race, curtailed 17 laps shy of the scheduled distance as severe thunderstorms hit the area under the seventh and final caution.

NOTE: Race was cut short to 283 laps due to rain.

Failed to qualify: Marcos Ambrose (#21), Tony Raines (#34)

Coke Zero 400 

The Coke Zero 400 powered by Coca-Cola was held on July 5 at Daytona International Speedway in Daytona Beach, Florida. Martin Truex Jr.'s car was seized by NASCAR, after the roof template would not fit during opening day technical inspection. Penalties of 150 owner and driver points penalties and a $100,000 fine along with his crew chief and his assistant (car chief) were both suspended for six races being announced on July 8. Paul Menard won the pole, the first of his Sprint Cup career. Tony Stewart became extremely ill on lap 73 and was replaced by former teammate J. J. Yeley. Kyle Busch won his sixth race of the season and the tenth of his career.

NOTE: Race was extended two laps under a green-white-checkered finish.

Failed to qualify: Scott Riggs (#66), J. J. Yeley (#96)

LifeLock.com 400 

The second half of the season began with the LifeLock.com 400, held under the lights for the first time on July 12 at Chicagoland Speedway in the Chicago, Illinois suburb of Joilet. It also served as the conclusion of TNT's Summer Series schedule. Qualifying was cancelled due to rain, so the field was set by NASCAR's rulebook. Points leader Kyle Busch won his seventh race of the season.

Failed to make race as qualifying was cancelled due to rain: Johnny Sauter (#08) and Tony Raines (#34).

Allstate 400 at The Brickyard 

The Allstate 400 at The Brickyard, kicking off ESPN and ABC's portion of the schedule, was run on July 27 at the legendary Indianapolis Motor Speedway in the Indianapolis suburb of Speedway, Indiana. Jimmie Johnson won the pole and then the race, which was slowed by nine out of eleven competition cautions because of extreme tire wear.

Failed to qualify: Bill Elliott (#21), Johnny Sauter (#08), Tony Raines (#34), Stanton Barrett (#50)

Sunoco Red Cross Pennsylvania 500 

The Sunoco Red Cross Pennsylvania 500 was held on August 3 of this year at Pocono Raceway in Long Pond, Pennsylvania. For the second straight week, Jimmie Johnson won the pole, but this time, it was Carl Edwards getting the win.

Failed to qualify: Chad Chaffin (#34).

Centurion Boats at The Glen 

The Centurion Boats at The Glen, the second and final road course race of the season, was held on August 10 at Watkins Glen International in the New York village of said racetrack. Qualifying was canceled due to rain, and the field was set by the rulebook. Kyle Busch swept both road races with his eighth Cup win and sixteenth overall in all three major series, and clinched the top position in the Chase for the Cup.

Failed to make race as qualifying was cancelled due to rain: Boris Said (#60) and Brian Simo (#34).

3M Performance 400 

The 3M Performance 400 was held August 19 at Michigan International Speedway in Brooklyn, Michigan. Team Red Bull's first pole position was earned by Brian Vickers in qualifying. A veritable parade of Roush Fenway Racing was led by race winner Carl Edwards, as four of the top five were all from the RFR stable and all five made the top ten.

Failed to qualify: Johnny Sauter (#08).

Sharpie 500 

The Sharpie 500 was held August 23 at Bristol Motor Speedway in Bristol, Tennessee. Carl Edwards, the defending race champion, would start on the pole and in the process, wrapped up a position in the Chase for the Sprint Cup. He then would go on to win the race, but on-track fireworks ensued afterwards when runner up Kyle Busch, whom Edwards would pass with 30 laps to go on a bump and run, bumped Edwards on the cooldown lap. Edwards then turned Busch.

Failed to qualify: Jeff Green (#34), Johnny Sauter (#08), Patrick Carpentier (#10), Stanton Barrett (#50).

Pepsi 500 

The Pepsi 500 was held on August 31 at Auto Club Speedway in Fontana, California. As part of the 2009 NASCAR realignment, this became the final race to be held here on Labor Day weekend. In 2009, this race becomes part of the 2009 Chase for the Sprint Cup, taking over the spot occupied for the fall race at Talladega Superspeedway, and was to have concluded ESPN's portion of the television schedule. Jimmie Johnson took the pole position, and dominated the race to win.

Failed to qualify: Tony Raines (#70).

Chevy Rock & Roll 400 

The final "regular season" race, the Chevy Rock and Roll 400, was scheduled to have been held on Saturday, September 6 at Richmond International Raceway in Henrico County, Virginia. However, Tropical Storm Hanna forced a postponement to Sunday, September 7 in the afternoon and television was moved from ABC to ESPN due to prior commitments to carry an WNBA game and an IndyCar Series race from Chicago, Illinois. This race set the field for the 2008 Chase for the Sprint Cup with the top 12 drivers becoming eligible, and having their points reset to 5,000 with a ten-point bonus for each win they earned in the first 26 races of the season. As Hanna canceled qualifying for the race, the field was set by rulebook.

Failed to make race as qualifying was canceled due to rain: Joey Logano (#02), Sterling Marlin (#09), Tony Raines (#34).

Drivers in green made Chase for Sprint Cup.

Chase for the Sprint Cup

Sylvania 300 

The first race of the 2008 Chase, and the 27th race of the season, the Sylvania 300, was run September 14 at New Hampshire Motor Speedway in Loudon, New Hampshire. Qualifying was canceled due to rain, so for the second week in a row, NASCAR's rulebook set the field. While Kyle Busch suffered mechanical problems with a bad sway bar, Greg Biffle won his first race since last October. Joey Logano made his NASCAR debut, finishing 32nd

Failed to make race as qualifying was canceled due to rain: Tony Raines (#34) and Carl Long (#46).
NOTE: The #02 car, which was to have been driven by Joey Logano was withdrawn as he was entered in the #96 ride.

Camping World RV 400 

The Camping World RV 400, the second race in the 2008 Chase and the 28th race overall, was run September 21 at Dover International Speedway in Dover, Delaware. Jeff Gordon won his third pole of the season, but it was Greg Biffle winning his second straight race.

Failed to qualify: Chad Chaffin (#34), Johnny Sauter (#08), Stanton Barrett (#50).

Camping World RV 400 presented by Coleman 

The Camping World RV 400 presented by Coleman, the third race in the Chase and the 29th overall this season, is scheduled for September 28 at Kansas Speedway in Kansas City, Kansas. Juan Pablo Montoya won his first NSCS pole for this race, however, he was disqualified and placed in the back of the field because of illegal shock absorbers that exceeded the maximum allowed by NASCAR, and Jimmie Johnson, who was second, was awarded the pole and went on to win the race.

Failed to qualify: Michael McDowell (#00), Johnny Sauter (#08).

AMP Energy 500 

The AMP Energy 500, the fourth race in the 2008 Chase and the 30th overall in the season, was held on October 5 at Talladega Superspeedway in Talladega, Alabama. Tony Stewart won the race, his first victory of the 2008 season, ending a winless streak of 43 races. Travis Kvapil pulled off a "Talladega Surprise" and won the pole position. In a race that saw a record 64 lead changes among 28 drivers, Regan Smith crossed the finish line in first place. However, he was dropped to 18th place (the last position on the lead lap) for illegally passing eventual winner Stewart in the tri-oval by driving below the yellow line on the inside of the track, which is prohibited at restrictor plate tracks. This race will be moved to November 1, 2009 as part of the 2009 NASCAR Schedule Realignment and the Pepsi 500 at Auto Club Speedway will be run in this spot next season.

Failed to qualify: Patrick Carpentier (#10) Sam Hornish Jr. (#77). NOTES: 1. The #08 car, which was to have been driven by Boris Said, was withdrawn earlier in the week.2. Race extended two laps due to green-white-checker finish rule.

Bank of America 500 

The Bank of America 500, the sole night race on the Chase schedule which marks its halfway point and the 31st overall race of the season, was held Saturday night, October 11 at Lowe's Motor Speedway in the Charlotte, North Carolina suburb of Concord. Qualifying was cancelled due to rain and the field was set by the rulebook for the eighth time this season. Jimmie Johnson was the polesitter, while Jeff Burton won the race and became a contender in the 2008 Chase once again.

Failed to make race as qualifying was cancelled due to rain: Brad Keselowski (#25), Bryan Clauson (#40), Derrike Cope (#75), Scott Speed (#82).

Tums QuikPak 500 

The Tums QuikPak 500, race number six in the Chase for the Sprint Cup and the 32nd overall race of the season, was held on October 19 at Martinsville Speedway in Ridgeway, Virginia. Qualifying was cancelled due to rain, and the field was set by the rulebook for a record ninth time this season. Jimmie Johnson was the winner.

NOTE: Race extended four laps due to green-white-checker finish rule.

Failed to make race as qualifying was cancelled due to rain: Sterling Marlin (#09), Derrike Cope (#75).

Following the race at NASCAR's Research and Development Center, an inspection found that Team Red Bull's #83 Toyota, driven by Brian Vickers, had sheet metal that was thinner than required. As a result, crew chief Kevin Hamlin and car chief Craig Smokstad were suspended indefinitely, Hamlin was fined $100,000 and the team lost 150 owner and driver points.

Pep Boys Auto 500 

The Pep Boys Auto 500, the seventh race in the Chase and the 33rd overall event this season, was scheduled to be raced on Sunday, October 26 at Atlanta Motor Speedway in Hampton, Georgia. As part of the 2009 schedule realignment, the race will be run in 2009 on Labor Day weekend and be replaced in the Chase schedule by the Pepsi 500 in Fontana, California while the date for this race will be used to run the AMP Energy 500 in Talladega, Alabama. For the third consecutive race and 10th overall this season, qualifying was cancelled because of rain, which meant Jimmie Johnson would be on the pole as NASCAR's rulebook set the field once again. Carl Edwards won his 7th race of the season.

Failed to make race as qualifying was cancelled due to rain: Joey Logano (#02), Bryan Clauson (#40)
NOTE: The #08 car, which was to have been driven by Johnny Sauter, was withdrawn earlier in the week.

Dickies 500 

The Dickies 500, the third-to-last race in the Chase and the season (race eight in the Chase and race 34 in the overall season) was held on November 2 at Texas Motor Speedway in Fort Worth, Texas. Jeff Gordon won his fourth pole of the year and his first at the track. Carl Edwards won his second consecutive race at the track making it his eighth win of the season. Brad Keselowski made his NASCAR debut, finishing 19th

Failed to qualify: Johnny Sauter (#08), Max Papis (#13), Bryan Clauson (#40), Chad McCumbee (#45), Tony Raines (#70)

Checker O'Reilly Auto Parts 500 

The Checker O'Reilly Auto Parts 500, serving as the penultimate Chase (ninth) and season (35th) race, was held on Sunday, November 9, at Phoenix International Raceway in Avondale, Arizona. Jimmie Johnson increase his Championship lead by winning the race and leading the majority of it. The race was delayed for just over an hour due to a light rain shower at lap 44, and a 9 car pileup on lap 273.

NOTE: Race extended one lap due to green-white-checker finish rule.

Failed to qualify: Joe Nemechek (#78)

Ford 400 

The 2008 season and Chase for the Sprint Cup Championship ended at Homestead, Florida's Homestead-Miami Speedway with the final race of the season, the Ford 400 on November 16, 2008. Carl Edwards won his ninth race of the season. Also, after 14 straight seasons with at least one victory from 1994 to 2007, Jeff Gordon failed to keep his winning streak alive in 2008. It would be first time that he didn't win a race since his rookie year in 1993. His 14-season winning streak of at least one race came to a total of 81 wins. His best finish in the 2008 season was 2nd place twice (Martinsville in March, and Texas in November).

Failed to qualify: Max Papis (#13) Sam Hornish Jr. (#77), Ken Schrader (#96)

Results and standings

Drivers' championship 

(key) Bold - Pole position awarded by time. Italics - Pole position set by owner's points standings. * – Most laps led.

Deductions 
The following drivers (and teams) were penalized both drivers and owners points for violations:
 Carl Edwards (#99 Roush Fenway Racing Ford) – 100 points plus 10 bonus points entering the 2008 Chase – Las Vegas (A post-race inspection found opened oil tank lid after UAW-Dodge 400.)
 Ryan Newman (#12 Penske Racing Dodge) – 25 points – Texas (Car was " higher than " tolerance following Samsung 500.)
 Scott Riggs and Johnny Sauter (#66 and #70 CNC Haas Chevrolets) – 150 points each – Charlotte (Illegal adjustments of wings on both cars; they drove their backup cars in Coca-Cola 600.)
 Martin Truex Jr. (#1 Dale Earnhardt, Inc. Chevrolet) – 150 points – Daytona (Roof on primary car failed inspection prior to Coke Zero 400; drove a backup car.)
 Brian Vickers (#83 Team Red Bull Toyota) – 150 points – Martinsville (A post-race inspection at NASCAR's R&D center found that the car had thinner sheet metal violated the rules following the Tums QuikPak 500.)
Robby Gordon was originally docked 100 points following the Daytona 500 for use of an illegal nose on his car; however, on March 5, the points were given back to his drivers and owners points total, but the team was fined $150,000 instead of $100,000 for said infraction.

Manufacturers' Championship 
Chevrolet won the NASCAR Manufacturers' Championship with 11 wins and 219 points for the season, over second place Ford who also had 11 wins, but only 215 points. Toyota finished third with 207 points, and Dodge fourth with 151 points.

Rookie of the Year 
The primary contenders for the Rookie title were Regan Smith and former Indy 500 winner Sam Hornish Jr. Smith became the first rookie driver to complete all races entered and nearly won the fall race at Talladega. Hornish meanwhile struggled to quickly adapt to stock cars but finished 7 points behind Smith. Canadian Patrick Carpentier missed the Daytona 500 but won the pole at New Hampshire. Road racer Michael McDowell ran 20 races for Michael Waltrip Racing. 2007 Indianapolis 500 winner Dario Franchitti managed to run the first 8 races before an injury during the Talladega Nationwide Series race, coupled with owner Chip Ganassi shutting down the No. 40 team, ended Franchitti's bid.

See also 
 2008 NASCAR Nationwide Series
 2008 NASCAR Craftsman Truck Series
 2008 NASCAR Camping World East Series
 2008 NASCAR Camping World West Series
 2008 NASCAR Canadian Tire Series
 2008 NASCAR Corona Series
 2008 Chase for the Sprint Cup
 List of NASCAR all-time cup winners
 2008 in sports

External links 
 NASCAR Radio Scanner
 Racing-Reference.info

References 

 
NASCAR Cup Series seasons